United Nations Security Council resolution 631, adopted unanimously on 8 February 1989, after recalling resolutions 598 (1987) and 618 (1988) and having considered a report by the Secretary-General Javier Pérez de Cuéllar on the United Nations Iran–Iraq Military Observer Group, the Council decided:

(a) to call on both Iran and Iraq to implement Resolution 598;
(b) to renew the mandate of the United Nations Iran–Iraq Military Observer Group for another seven months and twenty-two days until 30 September 1989;
(c) to request the Secretary-General to report on the situation and the measures taken to implement Resolution 598 at the end of this period.

See also
 Iran–Iraq relations
 Iran–Iraq War
 List of United Nations Security Council Resolutions 601 to 700 (1987–1991)

References
Text of the Resolution at undocs.org

External links
 

 0631
 0631
1989 in Iran
1989 in Iraq
February 1989 events